Kingguru is an island in the Solomon Islands; it is located in the Western Province.

Islands of the Solomon Islands
Western Province (Solomon Islands)